True Life Crime is an American true crime documentary television series that premiered on MTV on January 8, 2020.

Episodes

Series overview

Season 1 (2020)

Season 2 (2021)

References

2020 American television series debuts
2020s American documentary television series
MTV original programming
Documentary television series about crime
English-language television shows